Dan Eggen (born 13 January 1970) is a Norwegian football manager and former player. 

He has previously coached KFUM Oslo and Kolbotn in the Norwegian Premier League for women. He was capped 25 times for Norway, scoring two goals.

Career
Dan Eggen played as centre-back. He started his career in the Norwegian amateur leagues with sides such as Lyn, Årvoll and Ready. Later he went on to play for several teams outside of Norway: Danish teams BK Frem and Brøndby IF, Spanish teams Celta Vigo and Alavés (where he played in the 2001 UEFA Cup Final), French team Le Mans and Scottish club Rangers.

Eggen represented Norway in 25 caps, scoring two goals. He was a part of the 1994 and 1998 World Cup squads, and the 2000 European Football Championship squad. He was not used in any matches in the 1994 World Cup, but was a key player in 1998 and 2000. Eggen scored the equaliser against Morocco to secure a 2–2 draw for the Norwegians at the Stade de la Mosson, Montpellier in 1998.

After retirement
In 2005, Eggen started a bachelor's degree in economics at the University of Oslo, Norway. He is currently the manager of the rock band El Caco. He has studied football coaching at Wang Idrettsgymnas and has been head coach of Kolbotn in the Norwegian Premier League for women, and for KFUM.

Appears in Satyricon's DVD Roadkill Extravaganza, where he is visiting the band backstage, revealing himself as a fan of Norwegian black metal.

During a Pantera concert in Spain, Eggen joined the band on stage for 30 seconds and showed off headbanging and air guitar playing.

References

External links
Brøndby IF partial statistics 
Boldklubben Frem profile 

Eggen on stage with Pantera.

1970 births
Living people
Footballers from Oslo
Association football defenders
Norwegian footballers
Norway international footballers
Boldklubben Frem players
Brøndby IF players
Danish Superliga players
Le Mans FC players
Ligue 1 players
Ligue 2 players
Rangers F.C. players
La Liga players
Deportivo Alavés players
RC Celta de Vigo players
Lyn Fotball players
1994 FIFA World Cup players
1998 FIFA World Cup players
UEFA Euro 2000 players
Norwegian football managers
Norwegian expatriate footballers
Norwegian expatriate sportspeople in Denmark
Expatriate men's footballers in Denmark
Norwegian expatriate sportspeople in Spain
Expatriate footballers in Spain
Norwegian expatriate sportspeople in Scotland
Expatriate footballers in Scotland
Norwegian expatriate sportspeople in France
Expatriate footballers in France